Yom is a Biblical Hebrew word which occurs in the Hebrew Bible. The word means day in both Modern and Biblical Hebrew.

Overview
Although yom is commonly rendered as day in English translations, the word yom can be used in different ways to refer to different time spans:
Point of time (a specific day)
time period of a whole or half a day:
Period of light (as contrasted with the period of darkness),
Sunrise to sunset
Sunset to next sunset
General term for time ( as in 'days of our lives')
A year "lived a lot of days" 
Time period of unspecified length.  "days and days"

Biblical Hebrew has a limited vocabulary, with fewer words compared to other languages, such as English or Spanish. This means words often have multiple meanings determined by context. Strong's Lexicon yom is Hebrew #3117 יוֹם  The word Yom's root meaning is to be hot as the warm hours of a day.

Thus "yom", in its context, is sometimes translated as: "time" (Gen 4:3, Is. 30:8); "year" (I Kings 1:1, 2 Chronicles 21:19, Amos 4:4); "age" (Gen 18:11, 24:1 and 47:28; Joshua 23:1 and 23:2); "always" (Deuteronomy 5:29, 6:24 and 14:23, and in 2 Chronicles 18:7); "season" (Genesis 40:4, Joshua 24:7, 2 Chronicles 15:3);  epoch or 24-hour day (Genesis 1:5,8,13,19,23,31) – see "Creationism", below.

Yom relates to the concept of time. Yom is not just for day, days, but for time in general.  How yom is translated depends on the context of its use with other words in the sentence around it, using hermeneutics.

The word day is used somewhat the same way in the English language, examples: "In my grandfather's day, cars did not go very fast" or "In the day of the dinosaurs there were not many mammals."

The word Yom is used in the name of various Jewish feast days; as, Yom Kippur, the Day of Atonement; Yom teruah (lit., day of shouting) the Feast of Trumpets.

Yom is also used in each of the days of the week in the Hebrew calendar.

See also
Yom Tov, in plural Yamim Tovim, literally the Good Day(s), the Jewish holidays 
Yom tov sheni shel galuyot The second festival day in the Diaspora
Yom Kippur, Day of Atonement
Yom Kippur Katan Minor Day of Atonement
Yom Ha'atzmaut, Israeli Independence Day 
Yom HaShoah, full name Yom HaZikaron laShoah ve-laG'vurah, Holocaust and Heroism Remembrance Day
Yom Hazikaron Day of Remembrance for the Fallen Soldier
Yom Yerushalayim Jerusalem Day
The Day of the Lord Events of the end times.
Creationism
Young Earth creationism Yom has various meanings depending on its context, but the consecutive days in Genesis 1 mean 24 hours
Old Earth creationism Yom has various meanings.
Gap creationism  Yom is 24 hours, but there is a gap of time between Genesis 1:1 and 1:2, before the six consecutive days of creation.
Day-age creationism Yom is time span.
Progressive creationism Yom is time span, but there are gaps of time.
Evolutionary creationism (or Theistic evolution, making theory of evolution and Bible compatible): the literal interpretation of Yom is not crucial. Yom is sometimes also interpreted metaphorically.
Geology
Age of the Earth

Notes

References

Further reading
Gleason L. Archer, Encyclopedia of Bible Difficulties, pages 51-53, 60–61, Baker 1982
Norman L. Geisler, Baker Encyclopedia of Christian Apologetics, page 271, Zondervan 1999

Hebrew words and phrases in the Hebrew Bible